Peter B. Lawrence (Pete Lawrence) is a British amateur astronomer best known for being a presenter on the BBC's The Sky at Night. He is also well known for his high resolution images of the Sun, Moon and planets and specialises in taking images of time-limited phenomena such as eclipses and the aurora.

Biography 
Lawrence first became interested in astronomy when he was a small boy, around the time of the Apollo Moon landings. His parents bought him a small 40mm refractor telescope and very soon, after hunting down the planet Saturn with it, he was hooked. He used a copy of the Times Night Sky to locate Saturn and now supplies the monthly chart for the same guide.

Lawrence recalls 'I remember Sir Patrick Moore visiting my school and leaving such a strong lasting impression that I decided I just had to have a larger telescope. Being a schoolboy at the time, my funds were limited so my next telescope was completely homemade; I even ground the main 8.75" mirror myself!' Mirror grinding is a very labour-intensive task, and it took Lawrence a long time to make the mirror. The tube and mount were assembled from miscellaneous metal fixings which were welded together by Lawrence's father. The final instrument was successfully used for many years prior to Lawrence leaving home to study astrophysics at the University of Leicester.

After gaining his degree, Lawrence moved into software development and was the director of a computer software company called Data Graphic Applications Limited for many years. He developed a number of software programs during this time including a lift planning application called LiftPlan and a costing adjustment application called QuickQuote which was used in Citroen dealerships in the UK. He wrote numerous systems for Peugeot UK including a customer service system called CRES which utilised early document image processing technology. A side development of this development was a system called DGAView which was an early digital microfiche system aimed specifically at the motor industry. Astronomy became his main focus again after the loss of his youngest brother James, in 2004.

To date, many of Lawrence's images have been published both in magazines, books and on the internet. He has had more than 200 images published on the popular Spaceweather website as well as having numerous Astronomy Picture of the Day  entries published. All of his current work have been published under the name Pete Lawrence.

Lawrence is probably best known for innovative approaches to imaging, which show astronomical events and phenomena in unusual ways. Examples included the Lunar Parallax Demonstration Project  and a capture of the shadow cast by the planet Venus.

Lawrence joined the BBC's The Sky at Night presenting team in 2004 and continues to present the practical observing section of the program to this day. He promotes practical astronomy and provides the monthly Sky Guide for the Sky at Night Magazine. He provided astronomical consultancy for the BBC Wonders of the Solar System and acted as astronomical consultant for the BBC Stargazing Live series aired in early January 2011. He wrote or contributed to much of the downloadable support material for the show. He was also the astronomical consultant for the long running BBC Radio 4 series, The Archers, assisting in checking the script for Phil Archer's character when he took up astronomy.

In 2011, Lawrence travelled to the VLT platform in Paranal, Chile, with Brady Haran to produce a series of videos documenting the site and the telescopes. On this trip, Lawrence and Haran captured a live recording of the phenomenon known as the 'Green Flash'.

In 2016, Lawrence was filmed by BAFTA-nominated filmmaker Gary Tarn for an 11-minute documentary called SLOW TIME. One of four contributors, Lawrence was filmed working with his telescope to capture ethereal 'timescapes' of the Universe.

In 2017, Lawrence was the captain of the Leicester University alumni team in that year's Christmas series of University Challenge.

Originally observing from his home in Selsey, West Sussex, Lawrence moved to Thornton in Leicestershire in 2019, where he continues to observe. During the pandemic, Lawrence observed the planet Venus moving ever-closer to inferior conjunction. A run of extremely clear weather allowed him to capture the rare phenomenon known as the atmospheric ring of Venus, an effect which is only visible when the planet appears extremely close to the Sun in the sky when on the Earth side of its orbit.

Lawrence writes and illustrates astronomical topics for a number of publications. He has produced the Night Sky guide for the Daily Telegraph newspaper for many years. In addition he also acts as an expert guide on trips to see the Aurora Borealis and Solar Eclipses.

Academic background 
Lawrence attended and graduated from the University of Leicester with an honours degree in physics with astrophysics, but the fortuitously timed lure of an interesting job in computer software development diverted him away from any further academic studies.

Awards 
Lawrence was awarded the Royal Photographic Society's Davis Medal in 2014, a limited (only 18 were ever awarded) medal for services in the field of digital imaging.

Popular astronomy 
Lawrence continues to promote astronomy through popular articles and television.  He has appeared on Blue Peter and his skills and advice are much sought after in the field of solar and planetary imaging.

His interest in the night sky continues unabated today, and he has merged his computer expertise with astronomy, using digital cameras for astrophotography. Here, the lure and challenge of being able to capture images of dynamic astronomical events proved irresistible and after many years he now has an extensive library of images.

References

External links 
 BBC Sky at Night
 Pete Lawrence's website

Living people
21st-century British astronomers
Year of birth missing (living people)